Biathlon at the 2015 European Youth Olympic Winter Festival was held from 27 to 30 January 2015 at the Tschengla, Bürserberg, Austria.

Results

Medal table

Medalists

References 

2015 European Youth Olympic Winter Festival
2015 in biathlon
2015